Bruce Curry (born March 29, 1956, in Marlin, Texas), is an American former professional boxer. He was the WBC Super Lightweight Champion from 1983 to 1984.

Family
He is a member of a very traditional family in the boxing scene: he is the oldest of three brothers and all boxers (Bruce's younger brother Donald Curry is considered the most successful boxer in the family, having won four belts in the welterweight category (WBC, WBA, IBF and The Ring), and one in the light middleweight category (WBC), plus a spot in the International Boxing Hall of Fame).

Amateur career
Curry was a two-time Texas Golden Gloves Champion and runner-up to Sugar Ray Leonard at the 1976 U.S. Olympic Boxing Trials. Curry reportedly had an amateur record of 315-11. During his amateur career he was trained by Wesley Gale Parker.

Professional career
Curry turned professional in 1976 and won his first fourteen professional fights. On November 18, 1977, he fought Wilfred Benítez, the former WBA Junior Welterweight Champion. Curry knocked Benitez down three times but lost by a controversial ten-round split decision due to the scoring system.

He signed to fight Minoru Sugiya in Japan on January 26, 1978. He was then offered a rematch with Benitez, which would take place a mere 11 days later, on February 4. He decided to go take both fights. He knocked out Sugiya in three rounds and then flew back to the U.S. for the Benitez fight, which Benitez won by a ten-round majority decision. Benitez trained harder for the rematch and Curry was travel-worn. "I just wanted to get it done and go to bed," Curry said. "I should have sent out for coffee."

Curry won his next two fights and then lost back-to-back fights, getting stopped in nine rounds by Domingo Ayala and losing to Adolfo Viruet by a ten-round decision. Curry put together three straight wins and then fought Thomas Hearns, who was 19-0 with 18 knockouts. The 6' 1" Hearns stopped Curry in three rounds, however, the fight is best remembered in boxing circles as a rare but true example of "going down swinging," with Curry punching valiantly even as he fell to the canvas.

He won eleven of his next thirteen fights and then got his first world title shot. On May 18, 1983, Curry beat Leroy Haley by a twelve-round unanimous decision to win the WBC Super Lightweight Championship. Curry's younger brother, Donald, won the WBA Welterweight Championship several months earlier. They were the first pair of brothers to hold world titles simultaneously. Another Curry brother, Graylin, was also a professional boxer.

Curry made two successful title defenses, knocking out Hidekazu Akai in seven rounds and winning a rematch with Haley by a twelve-round split decision. On January 29, 1984, Curry lost the title by a tenth-round knockout to Billy Costello.

On February 2, 1984, Curry was arrested in Las Vegas, Nevada, after he fired several shots at his trainer, Jesse Reid, following an altercation at a gym. He had fought with Reid after blaming him for his loss to Costello. Curry was charged with assault with a deadly weapon and carrying a concealed weapon.

Curry was found innocent by reason of insanity and ordered confined to a mental hospital until he was no longer a threat to society. He was released on March 26, 1985, after a team of three psychiatrists said he was no longer mentally ill.

Curry fought just one more time, defeating Tomas Garcia by a ten-round decision on April 29, 1986. He finished with a record of 35-8 with 17 knockouts.

Professional boxing record

See also
Notable boxing families
List of world light-welterweight boxing champions

References

External links

 

1956 births
Living people
American male boxers
Boxers from Texas
People from Marlin, Texas
African-American boxers
World Boxing Council champions
Light-welterweight boxers
World light-welterweight boxing champions